The Dallas Skyline are an American professional basketball team based in Richardson, Texas, and a member of The Basketball League (TBL).

History
On May 10 2019, it was announced a new franchise called the Dallas Skyline would compete in the 2020 season with Prescott Mack is the team owner.    

It was announced on October 14, 2019, that the Loos Fieldhouse in Addison, Texas would host the team for 2020 season. The team moved to the University of Texas at Dallas in Richardson, Texas for the 2021 season.

Current roster

References

The Basketball League teams
Basketball teams in Dallas
Richardson, Texas
Basketball teams established in 2019